Grainger McKoy (born in 1947) is an artist who draws inspiration from the dynamics of bird behavior. He is best known for his wood sculptures but also produces jewelry and gifts.

History
Victor Grainger McKoy was born in North Carolina in 1947. After receiving an antique duck decoy from his grandmother as a child, McKoy carved his first bird out of wood - a shorebird from cypress wood. He is a graduate in the class of 1965 of Edmunds High School (now Sumter High School), Sumter, S. C. In 1965, he attended Clemson University in South Carolina and pursued a bachelor's degree in architecture, which turned into a zoology degree. After college, he took an apprenticeship under the bird carver Gilbert Maggioni.

Once McKoy learned how to mold bronze and gold, he expanded his repertoire into steel, bronze, sterling silver, gold, and platinum. for these, he first carves into wood and then uses a lost-wax cast to produce metal pieces. He subsequently began creating smaller sculptures and casting them into jewelry for his wife.

In 2010, a public park called Swan Lake Iris Gardens in Sumter, South Carolina, commissioned Grainger Mckoy to create an outdoor installation.  "Recovery" is a stainless steel statue representing the wing of a pintail duck in flight.

From September 2011 through January 2012, the High Museum of Art in Atlanta housed a Grainger McKoy exhibit, showcasing over 30 of his sculptures and drawings. The museum said that McKoy's sculptures "grip the observant viewer with trompe l’oeil illusion, while rejecting the confounding trickery often implicit in that 'trick of the eye' style. Rather McKoy invites us to question, wonder, observe, and above all, revel in the pure beauty of his birds."

References

External links
Grainger McKoy Website
Sports Illustrated - "Art on the Wing"
Sumter, South Carolina Government Site

American bird artists
1947 births
Living people
Artists from North Carolina
People from Wilmington, North Carolina